Planorbella trivolvis is a species of freshwater air-breathing snail, an aquatic pulmonate gastropod mollusk in the family Planorbidae, the ram's horn snails, or planorbids, which all have sinistral or left-coiling shells.

Description
All species within family Planorbidae have sinistral shells. The width of the shell of this species is up to 18 mm.

Distribution
This pond snail is native to North America, from the Arctic areas of Canada all the way south to Florida. It has also been introduced in other parts of the world.

 Peru
 Dominica

Habitat
This species prefers habitats with floating water weeds.

Parasites
 Planorbella trivolvis is an intermediate host for Echinostoma trivolvis.

References

Further reading
 CYNTHIA G. NORTON & JENNIFER M. BRONSON (2006) "THE RELATIONSHIP OF BODY SIZE AND GROWTH TO EGG PRODUCTION IN THE HERMAPHRODITIC FRESHWATER SNAIL, HELISOMA TRIVOLVIS". Journal of Molluscan Studies 72(2): 143-147. 
 Norton C. G., Johnson A. F. & Mueller R. L. (2008) "Relative size influences gender role in the freshwater hermaphroditic snail, Helisoma trivolvis". Behavioral Ecology 19(6): 1122-1127.  
 
 
 
  Johnson, P. D.; Bogan, A. E.; Brown, K. M.; Burkhead, N. M.; Cordeiro, J. R.; Garner, J. T.; Hartfield, P. D.; Lepitzki, D. A. W.; Mackie, G. L.; ; Tarpley, T. A.; Tiemann, J. S.; Whelan, N. V.; Strong, E. E. (2013). Conservation status of freshwater gastropods. of Canada and the United States. Fisheries. 38(6): 247-282

Planorbella
Gastropods described in 1817